Charlestown is an unincorporated community located within Bethlehem Township, in Hunterdon County, New Jersey, United States, off County Route 635,  southwest of Hampton.

History
By 1881, Charlestown had a school, wheelwright shop, blacksmith and about twelve dwellings.

References

Bethlehem Township, New Jersey
Unincorporated communities in Hunterdon County, New Jersey
Unincorporated communities in New Jersey